Franco Donatoni (9 June 1927 – 17 August 2000) was an Italian composer.

Biography 
Born in Verona, Donatoni started studying violin at the age of seven, and frequented the local music academy. Later, he studied at the Milan Conservatory and, from 1948, at the Bologna Conservatory.

At least three generations of composers studied with Donatoni. Among his Italian pupils were Sandro Gorli, Roberto Carnevale, Giulio Castagnoli, Ivan Fedele, Luca Mosca, Riccardo Piacentini, Fausto Romitelli, Luc Brewaeys, Pietro Borradori, Giuseppe Sinopoli, Alessandro Solbiati, and Piero Niro; his foreign pupils include Michael Dellaira, Pascal Dusapin, Sylvie Bodorová, Esa-Pekka Salonen, Magnus Lindberg, Katia Tiutiunnik, Javier Torres Maldonado, and Juan Trigos. 

Donatoni died in Milan in 2000.

Works

References

Works cited

Further reading
Barkl, Michael. 2018. Etwas ruhiger im Ausdruck: Franco Donatoni's Crisis. Beau Bassin: Lambert Academic Publishing. .
Luppi, Guillermo. 2016. "Shedding Some Light on Donatoni's Lumen". Perspectives of New Music 54, no. 1 (Winter): 179–195.

External links
Obituary in The Musical Times
A reminiscence of Donatoni by Jeffrey Levine

1927 births
2000 deaths
Italian classical composers
Italian male classical composers
Accademia Musicale Chigiana alumni
Academic staff of the Accademia Nazionale di Santa Cecilia
Accademia Nazionale di Santa Cecilia alumni
Conservatorio Giovanni Battista Martini alumni
Milan Conservatory alumni
Musicians from Verona
20th-century classical composers
International Rostrum of Composers prize-winners
20th-century Italian composers
Twelve-tone and serial composers
20th-century Italian male musicians